Seoul FC Martyrs was a South Korean football club based in the Gangbuk-gu district of Seoul.

Season-by-season results

See also
 Football in Seoul

References

K3 League (2007–2019) clubs
Sport in Seoul
Football clubs in Seoul
2009 establishments in South Korea
Association football clubs established in 2009
Association football clubs disestablished in 2015